The 2013 NA LCS season was the first year of the North American League of Legends Championship Series. It was divided into spring and summer splits, each consisting of a regular season and playoff stage. The top six teams from the regular season advanced to the playoff stage, with the top two teams receiving a bye to the semifinals. Regular season games were played in a film studio in Sawtelle, Los Angeles, California.

The spring split began on February 7 and concluded with the spring finals on April 28. Both the regular season and playoffs were won by Team SoloMid with a roster consisting of Dyrus, TheOddOne, Reginald, WildTurtle, and Xpecial.

The summer regular season and playoffs were both won by Cloud9 in their debut split, with a roster consisting of Balls, Meteos, Hai, Sneaky and LemonNation. Cloud9 also set a historic regular season finish of 25–3, a record which stood until PAX 2013.

Cloud9, TeamSoloMid and Team Vulcun qualified for the Season 3 World Championship by placing first, second and third respectively in the summer playoffs.

Spring

Regular season

Playoffs

Summer

Regular season

Playoffs

References 

League of Legends Championship Series seasons
North American League of Legends Championship
North American League of Legends Championship
North American League of Legends Championship
North American League of Legends Championship